{{DISPLAYTITLE:C15H13NO2}}
The molecular formula C15H13NO2 (molar mass: 239.27 g/mol) may refer to:

 Diarylpropionitrile (DPN or 2,3-BHPPN)
 Hydroxyacetylaminofluorene

Molecular formulas